Scooby-Doo! in Arabian Nights (also known as Arabian Nights) is a 1994 made-for-television film produced by Hanna-Barbera, and aired on syndication on September 3, 1994. It is an adaptation of The Book of One Thousand and One Nights and features appearances by Scooby-Doo and Shaggy Rogers, in wraparound segments.

The bulk of the special is devoted to two tales, one featuring Yogi Bear and Boo-Boo Bear, and the other starring Magilla Gorilla. It is animated with bright colors, stylized character designs and a more flat style compared to the previous television films, and musically scored by veteran animation composer Steven Bernstein, showing strong influence from the high-budget Warner Bros. Animation and Steven Spielberg cartoons of the era, Tiny Toon Adventures and Animaniacs.

This would prove to be the last time in which Don Messick voices Scooby and Boo Boo before his retirement in 1996 (though he would voice Scooby one more time in the video game Scooby-Doo Mystery), the last time in which Casey Kasem voices Shaggy until 2002, the last in which Allan Melvin voices Magilla Gorilla (as well as his last film role overall), and also the last time Greg Burson voiced Yogi officially before being arrested and blacklisted in 2004 (though he would briefly voice him one more time in the parody short, A Day in the Life of Ranger Smith).

Plot

Prologue
Scooby-Doo and Shaggy arrive in Arabia on a magic carpet to become royal food tasters for the young Caliph. They are initially hired. After they eat everything in sight and leave no food for the Caliph, he and the Royal Chef get angry and the Caliph orders his guards to kill them. Shaggy and Scooby-Doo find a place to hide and Shaggy takes on the disguise as a harem girl. The Caliph, who is looking for a bride, falls in love with the disguised Shaggy and decides that they shall be married. Hoping to make the Caliph fall asleep so they can make their escape, Shaggy tells him two classic stories.

Aliyah-Din and the Magic Lamp

The Sultan of the land is worried as his son, The Prince, has not yet chosen a bride to marry; so he decides to have every eligible woman arrive the next day so that his son may finally get married. However, the Prince notices a young woman near a river washing her clothes and immediately falls in love with her; she notices him and runs off, leaving her scarf behind.

However, Haman the vizier is trying to become Sultan. He learns of a magical lamp hidden in a cave that is revealed every three years during a blue moon, but only a person pure of heart can enter the cave; that person being a young woman named Aliyah-Din (the same woman the Prince has fallen in love with). Haman goes into town and finds Aliyah-Din, where he tells her about the lamp, saying that it has special powers that will help heal the sick Sultan, to which Aliyah-Din agrees to help.

Later that day, the Prince is still searching for Aliyah-Din where he also attracts a lot of attention from many women who seek to marry him. Meanwhile, Aliyah-Din is late meeting with Haman, but on her way, she discovers the news that the Prince shall choose a bride the next day. Aliyah-Din and the Prince then bump into each other, and Aliyah-Din falls in love with the Prince. However, remembering her duties to help retrieve the lamp, Aliyah-Din is forced to leave.

At night, Aliyah-Din meets with Haman where they witness the cave opening. Aliyah-Din goes into the cave and finds the lamp, but the cave starts to collapse and it soon closes, leaving her and the lamp trapped inside. Aliyah-Din then rubs the lamp which releases Yogi Bear, a fully powered Genie and his sidekick Boo-Boo, a Genie-in-training, who reveal to Aliyah-Din that she is their new master and they are allowed to grant her three wishes.

Meanwhile, back at the Palace, Haman creates a special potion to use on the Sultan that will make him fall into a deep sleep. He goes to the Sultan's chambers where the potion takes immediate effect; soon after the Prince arrives, unaware of the spell. The Prince apologizes for not having selected a bride, revealing he will choose a bride and marry whoever it may be the next day. However, the Prince notices his father's condition and Haman puts the Prince under the same spell. Haman then brings the unconscious Prince to the dungeons before taking on the Prince's appearance.

Aliyah-Din then goes to the palace after wishing to become a princess. Haman reveals himself, takes the lamp, and has Aliyah-Din thrown into the dungeon. Haman uses his first 2 wishes to make himself sultan and ruler of the whole universe. Aliyah-Din escapes from the dungeon and removes the lamp from Haman's grasp, leaving him without a third wish. Aliyah-Din finally gets a do-over of three wishes and uses her first wish to bring everything back to normal.

With everything fully restored, The Prince regains consciousness and orders the palace guards to arrest Haman. The Prince then reunites with Aliyah-Din and returns her scarf before asking her to marry him. The now-awakened Sultan arrives and the Prince introduces his father to Aliyah-Din and reveals his desire to marry her. The Sultan, however, cannot bless their desire for marriage, as he reveals to his son that he can only marry a princess.

Saddened, The Prince apologizes to Aliyah-Din. However, upon learning her name, The Sultan realizes that Aliyah-Din is the long-lost princess the Prince was engaged to and allows them to be married. The Prince and Aliyah-Din celebrate their engagement and share a kiss, as Boo-Boo finally becomes a full-fledged Genie.

Interlude
After the first story, the Caliph was impressed the story and starts to make plans for the wedding by having the Royal Dress Worker pick out a dress. Scooby-Doo had to pose as the Royal Dress Worker's assistant to measure out a dress. Afterwards, Shaggy begins the next story.

Sinbad the Sailor

The second and final tale is about Sinbad the Sailor (played by Magilla Gorilla) and how he mistakes a pirate ship for a cruise ship. Abandoned by his own crew, the maniacal little pirate captain takes advantage of Magilla's situation and passes himself off as a cruise director with the plan to use Sinbad for stealing a rare rhuk egg from its nest, jewels from the Stream of Precious Gems (presented as a Pirates of the Caribbean-esque dark ride), and a golden toothbrush (owned by a stuffy rich cyclops), passing off the thefts as being part of a scavenger hunt. A running gag in the story involves the pirate ship getting sunk, followed by the cruise ship Sinbad was supposed to board sailing by.

Finale
Before Shaggy can escape, the Caliph decides to start the ceremony right away. When the wedding cake arrives, Shaggy pigs out, and his ruse is discovered by the Royal Chef. However, the Caliph reveals that since he enjoyed listening to the stories and was distracted from his hunger, he has decided to make Shaggy and Scooby royal storytellers which the duo happily accept as well as maintaining their royal food tasting job. Shaggy, Scooby-Doo, the Caliph, and the Royal Chef then eat the large cake.

Voice cast
 Casey Kasem - Shaggy Rogers
 Don Messick - Scooby-Doo, Boo-Boo Bear as the Genie-in-Training
 Eddie Deezen - Caliph
 Greg Burson - Royal Chef, Yogi Bear as the Genie
 Charlie Adler - Royal Guard #1, Pirate Captain
 Brian Cummings - Flying Carpet Driver, Royal Guard #2, Sultan
 Nick Jameson - Kitchen Worker, Dress Worker
 Jennifer Hale - Aliyah-Din
 John Kassir - Haman
 Rob Paulsen - Prince
 Paul Eiding - Scribe
 Tony Jay - Lord of the Amulet
 Kath Soucie - Princess, Female Townsfolk
 Allan Melvin - Magilla Gorilla as Sinbad
 Maurice LaMarche - M. Cyclops
 Frank Welker - Baby Ruhk Bird, Mother Ruhk Bird, Robot Dragon Head

Home media
In March 1995, right after the special aired, it was released for the first time on VHS, distributed by Turner Home Entertainment in the United States and internationally in the UK and other countries and in South Africa by Ster-Kinekor Home Video. In June 1996, there was a reprint for this tape, except it had the same previews in it and no closing. On September 3, 2004, on its 10th anniversary, it was re-released on VHS and for the first time on DVD, with extras like "Get the Picture with Scooby-Doo and Shaggy", a special music video for "America's In Love with Scooby-Doo", a Scooby Concentration Challenge, and some bonus trailers for further cartoons.

Follow-up film
The Scooby-Doo! animated film series wound up going on hiatus until Scooby-Doo on Zombie Island was released on September 22, 1998.

References

External links
 

1994 films
1994 animated films
1994 fantasy films
1994 television films
American animated television films
1990s children's fantasy films
Animated crossover films
Films based on One Thousand and One Nights
Warner Bros. Animation animated films
Warner Bros. direct-to-video animated films
Hanna-Barbera animated films
Scooby-Doo animated films
Yogi Bear films
Animated anthology films
American children's animated comedy films
1990s children's animated films
Films directed by Jun Falkenstein
Cross-dressing in American films
1990s American films